Eupithecia tranquilla is a moth in the family Geometridae. It is found in Madagascar.

References

Moths described in 1988
tranquilla
Moths of Madagascar